West End Airport  is an airport that serves Grand Bahama. While smaller than the other airport on the island located in Freeport, this airport has a paved runway 7,999 feet in length as well as onsite customs and immigration. This airport currently serves private planes and charters. The airport features the westernmost runway in the entire Bahamian archipelago.

Historical airline services 

According to its route map, in 1971 Northeast Airlines was operating scheduled passenger jet service nonstop between Boston (BOS) and the airport.

References

Airports in the Bahamas